This is a comprehensive list of major music awards received by U2, an Irish rock band that formed in 1976, and whose members are Bono, the Edge, Adam Clayton, and Larry Mullen Jr. U2 have been one of the most popular acts in the world since the mid-1980s. The band has sold more than 170 million albums worldwide and has won 22 Grammy Awards, more than any other band.

U2 formed in 1976 when the members were teenagers with limited musical proficiency. By the mid-1980s, however, the band had become a top international act, noted for its anthemic sound, Bono's impassioned vocals, and The Edge's textural guitar playing. Their success as a live act was greater than their success as a record-selling act until their 1987 album, The Joshua Tree, which brought them mega-stardom.

Academy Awards
The Academy Awards is an annual American awards ceremony hosted by the Academy of Motion Picture Arts and Sciences to recognize excellence in cinematic achievements in the United States film industry as assessed by the academy's voting membership.

American Music Awards
The American Music Awards is an annual American music awards show.

|-
| rowspan="2" | 1988 || U2 || Favorite Pop/Rock Band/Duo/Group || 
|-
| The Joshua Tree || rowspan="2" | Favorite Pop/Rock Album || 
|-
| rowspan="2" | 1993 || Achtung Baby || 
|-
| rowspan="5" | U2 || rowspan="4" | Favorite Pop/Rock Band/Duo/Group || 
|-
| 1994 || 
|-
| 1998 || 
|-
| rowspan="2" | 2002 || 
|-
| Artist of the Year || 
|-
| 2017 || The Joshua Tree Tour 2017 || rowspan="2" | Tour of the Year || 
|-
| 2018 || Experience + Innocence Tour || 
|}

Billboard Music Award
The Billboard Music Awards are sponsored by Billboard magazine and are held annually in December. The awards are based on sales data by Nielsen SoundScan and radio information by Nielsen Broadcast Data Systems. U2 has nine awards from sixteen nominations.

|-
| rowspan="5" | 1992 || rowspan="3"| U2 || No. 1 Album Rock Tracks Artist || 
|-
| No. 1 Modern Rock Tracks Artist || 
|-
| No. 1 Boxscore Tour || 
|-
| "Mysterious Ways" || No. 1 Album Rock Track || 
|-
| "One" || No. 1 Modern Rock Track || 
|-
| 2005 || rowspan="9" | U2 || Top Billboard 200 Artist ||  
|-
| rowspan="2" | 2011 || Top Duo/Group || 
|-
| rowspan="3" | Top Touring Artist || 
|-
| 2012 || 
|-
| rowspan="2" | 2016 || 
|-
| Top Duo/Group || 
|-
| rowspan="4" | 2018 || Top Touring Artist || 
|-
| Top Rock Tour || 
|-
| Top Duo/Group || 
|-
| Songs of Experience || Top Rock Album || 
|-
|  2019
| Experience + Innocence Tour
| Top Rock Tour
| 
|}

Billboard Touring Awards
The Billboard Touring Awards is an annual meeting sponsored by Billboard magazine which also honors the top international live entertainment industry artists and professionals. It was established in 2004. In 1992, U2 won No. 1 Album Tracks Artist at the Billboard Music Award for "Mysterious Ways".

|-
| rowspan="3" | 2005 || rowspan="3" | Vertigo Tour|| Top Tour || 
|-
| Top Draw || 
|-
| Top Boxscore || 
|-
| 2009 || U2 360° Tour || Top Boxscore || 
|-
| rowspan="2" | 2010 || rowspan="2" | U2 360° Tour || Top Tour || 
|-
| Top Draw || 
|-
| rowspan="2" | 2011 || rowspan="2" | U2 360° Tour || Top Tour || 
|-
| Top Draw || 
|-
| 2015 || Innocence + Experience Tour  || Top Boxscore || 
|-
| rowspan="3" | 2017 || rowspan="3" | The Joshua Tree Tour 2017 || Top Boxscore || 
|-
| Top Tour || 
|-
| Top Draw || 
|}

Brit Awards
The Brit Awards are awarded annually by the British Phonographic Industry.

|-
| rowspan="2" | 1985 || The Unforgettable Fire || British Album of the Year || 
|-
| rowspan="4" | U2 || rowspan="2" | British Group || 
|-
| 1986 || 
|-
| 1988 || rowspan="2" | International Group || 
|-
| rowspan="2" | 1989 || 
|-
| Rattle and Hum || Soundtrack/Cast Recording || 
|-
| 1990 || rowspan="8" | U2 || rowspan="3" | International Group || 
|-
| 1992 || 
|-
| rowspan="2" | 1993 || 
|-
| Most Successful Live Act || 
|-
| 1994 || rowspan="3" | International Group || 
|-
| 1998 || 
|-
| rowspan="2" | 2001 || 
|-
| Outstanding Contribution to Music || 
|-
| rowspan="3" | 2005 || "Take Me to the Clouds Above"  || British Single of the Year || 
|-
| How to Dismantle an Atomic Bomb || International Album || 
|-
| U2 || International Group || 
|-
| rowspan="2" | 2006 || How to Dismantle an Atomic Bomb || International Album || 
|-
| rowspan="2" | U2 || rowspan="2" | International Group || 
|-
| 2016 || 
|}

Craig Awards

|-
| 2010 || U2 360° Tour || Best Tour || 
|}

Critics' Choice Movie Awards
The Critics' Choice Movie Awards is an awards show presented annually by the Broadcast Film Critics Association to honor the finest in cinematic achievement.

|-
| 2004 || "Time Enough for Tears" || rowspan="2" | Best Song || 
|-
| 2014 || "Ordinary Love" || 
|}

GAFFA Awards

GAFFA Awards (Denmark)
Delivered since 1991, the GAFFA Awards are a Danish award that rewards popular music by the magazine of the same name.

!
|-
| rowspan="3"| 1991
| Achtung Baby
| Album of the Year
| 
| style="text-align:center;" rowspan="24"|
|-
| "The Fly"
| Song of the Year
| 
|-
| rowspan="2"| U2
| rowspan="2"| Band
| 
|-
| rowspan="3"| 1992
| 
|-
| rowspan="2"| "One"
| Song of the Year
| 
|-
| Music Video of the Year
| 
|-
| rowspan="4"| 1993
| U2
| Concert of the Year
| 
|-
| Zooropa
| Album of the Year
| 
|-
| rowspan="2"| U2
| Most Underrated
| 
|-
| Band
| 
|-
| rowspan="3"| 1997
| Bono (U2)
| Best Foreign Male Act
| 
|-
| rowspan="4"| U2
| Concert of the Year
| 
|-
| rowspan="3"| Band
| 
|-
| 1998
| 
|-
| rowspan="4"| 2000
| 
|-
| All That You Can't Leave Behind
| Album of the Year
| 
|-
| Bono (U2)
| Best Foreign Male Act
| 
|-
| "Beautiful Day"
| Best Foreign Song
| 
|-
| 2001
| rowspan="2"| U2
| Foreign Live Act
| 
|-
| rowspan="3"| 2004
| Best Foreign Band
| 
|-
| How To Dismantle An Atomic Bomb
| Best Foreign Album
| 
|-
| "Vertigo"
| Best Foreign Song
| 
|-
| 2005
| Vertigo 2005: Live from Chicago
| rowspan="2"| Best Foreign DVD
| 
|-
| 2006
| Zoo TV: Live From Sydney
| 
|-
| 2018
| U2
| Best Foreign Band
| 
| style="text-align:center;" |
|-
|}

GAFFA Awards (Sweden)
Delivered since 2010, the GAFFA Awards (Swedish: GAFFA Priset) are a Swedish award that rewards popular music awarded by the magazine of the same name.

!
|-
| 2018
| U2
| Best Foreign Band
| 
| style="text-align:center;" |
|-
|}

Golden Globe Awards
The Golden Globe Awards are awarded annually by the Hollywood Foreign Press Association. U2 was nominated five times for Best Original Song: Their song "Stay (Faraway, So Close!)" from the Wim Wenders film Faraway, So Close! was nominated in 1994, but lost against Bruce Springsteen's "Streets of Philadelphia". For "Hold Me, Thrill Me, Kiss Me, Kill Me" from Batman Forever, they were nominated again in 1996, but lost to "Colors of the Wind" by Vanessa L. Williams. In 2003, they received the award for "The Hands That Built America", which appeared in the film Gangs of New York. In 2010 their song "Winter" for the film Brothers was also nominated but lost to "The Weary Kind" by Ryan Bingham for the film Crazy Heart. The Edge of U2 described how the band plans to celebrate the nomination. "I think we might have a pint of Guinness in honor of (director) Jim (Sheridan) and his great piece of work. In 2014, "Ordinary Love" won the Golden Globe Award for Best Original Song.

Golden Raspberry Awards
The Golden Raspberry Awards are parody awards honoring the worst achievements in cinema. U2 was nominated for one Golden Raspberry Award.

Grammy Awards
They have won 22 awards from 46 nominations. The Grammy Award are awarded annually by the Recording Academy in the United States. They have won Best Rock Performance by a Duo or Group seven times, while winning Album of the Year, Record of the Year, Song of the Year, and Best Rock Album all twice.

Rock and Roll Hall of Fame

|-
| 2005 || U2 || Inductee || 
|}

Sports Emmy Awards
The Sports Emmy Awards are presented by the National Academy of Television Arts and Sciences (NATAS) in recognition of excellence in American sports television programming, including sports-related series, live coverage of sporting events, and best sports announcers.

|-
| 2011 || 2010 FIFA World Cup – U2 & Soweto Gospel Choir || Outstanding Music Composition/Direction/Lyrics || 
|}

UK Music Video Awards

The UK Music Video Awards is an annual award ceremony founded in 2008 to recognise creativity, technical excellence and innovation in music videos and moving images for music.

 
|-
| rowspan="4" | 2015
| rowspan="4" | "Every Breaking Wave"
| Best Rock/Indie Video - International
|  
|-
| Best Art Direction 
|  
|-
| Best Cinematography
| 
|-
| Best Editing 
|

World Soundtrack Academy
The World Soundtrack Academy launched in 2001 by the Flanders International Film Festival Ghent

|-
| 2003 || "The Hands That Built America" || rowspan="2" | Best Original Song Written Directly for a Film || 
|-
| 2014 || "Ordinary Love" || 
|}

References
Footnotes

Bibliography
 

Award
Lists of awards received by Irish musician
Lists of awards received by musical group